This is the discography for Russian electronic music producer and DJ Arty, also known as Artem Stoliarov. Arty has released one studio album and forty-eight singles under his main name, and ten singles under his trance alias Alpha 9. In October 2015, Arty released his debut album Glorious which contained singles "Up All Night", "Stronger", and "Braver Love".

Albums

Studio albums

Compilation albums

Extended plays

As Arty

As Alpha 9

Singles

As lead artist

As Arty 

Notes
 Note 1: Mashup of singles "You Got To Go" and "Believe In Me".
 Note 2: This is the "Original Mix", not the "Alesso Mix". The original single was debuted on Refune Radio 005.

As Alpha 9

As featured artist

Promotional singles

Remixes

As Arty

As Alpha 9

Music videos

As lead artist

As featured artist

References 

Discographies of Russian artists
Electronic music discographies